Guillermo Díaz Gastambide (born 31 December 1979 in Montevideo) is a Uruguayan football who played as a defender.

References

External links

1979 births
Living people
Footballers from Montevideo
Uruguayan footballers
Peñarol players
Juventud de Las Piedras players
F.C. Motagua players
FBC Melgar footballers
El Tanque Sisley players
Liga Nacional de Fútbol Profesional de Honduras players
Expatriate footballers in Honduras
Expatriate footballers in Peru
Association football defenders